Marshall Howard Berman (November 24, 1940 – September 11, 2013) was an American philosopher and Marxist humanist writer. He was a Distinguished Professor of Political Science at The City College of New York and at the Graduate Center of the City University of New York, teaching political philosophy and urbanism.

Life and work
Marshall Berman was born in New York City on November 24, 1940, and spent his childhood in Tremont, then a predominately Jewish neighborhood of the South Bronx. His parents Betty and Murray Berman (both children of Jewish Eastern European immigrants) owned the Betmar Tag and Label Company. His father died of a heart attack at age 48 in the autumn of 1955, shortly after the family had moved to the Kingsbridge neighborhood of the Bronx. Berman attended the Bronx High School of Science, and was an alumnus of Columbia University, receiving a Bachelor of Letters at the University of Oxford where he was a student of Sir Isaiah Berlin. Berman completed his Doctor of Philosophy degree at Harvard University in 1968. He began working at City College in 1968 where he taught until his death. He was on the editorial board of Dissent and a regular contributor to The Nation, The New York Times Book Review, and the Village Voice.

In Adventures in Marxism, Berman tells of how, while a Columbia University student in 1959, the chance discovery of Karl Marx's Economic and Philosophic Manuscripts of 1844 proved a revelation and inspiration, and became the foundation for all his future work. This personal tone pervades his work, linking historical trends with individual observations and inflections from a particular situation. Berman is best known for his book All That Is Solid Melts into Air. Some of his other books include The Politics of Authenticity, Adventures in Marxism, On the Town: A Hundred Years of Spectacle in Times Square (2006). His final publication was the "Introduction" to the Penguin Classics edition of The Communist Manifesto. Also in the 2000s, Berman co-edited (with Brian Berger) an anthology, New York Calling: From Blackout To Bloomberg, for which he wrote the introductory essay. Berman also was a participant in Ric Burns' landmark eight-part documentary titled New York.

He died on September 11, 2013, of a heart attack. According to friend and fellow author Todd Gitlin, Berman suffered the heart attack while eating at one of his favorite Upper West Side restaurants, the Metro Diner.

Modernity and modernism
During the mid- to late 20th century, philosophical discourse focused on issues of modernity and the cultural attitudes and philosophies towards the modern condition. Berman put forward his own definition of modernism to counter postmodern philosophies.

Berman's view of modernism is at odds with postmodernism. Paraphrasing Charles Baudelaire, Michel Foucault defined the attitude of modernity as "the ironic heroization of the present." Berman viewed postmodernism as a soulless and hopeless echo chamber. He addressed this specifically in his Preface to the 1988 reprint of All That Is Solid Melts Into Air:

Berman's view of modernism also conflicts with anti-modernism according to critic George Scialabba, who is persuaded by Berman's critique of postmodernism but finds the challenge posed by the anti-modernists to be more problematic. Scialabba admires Berman's stance as a writer and thinker, calling him "earnest and a democrat", and capable of withstanding the anti-modernist challenge as it has been posed by the likes of Christopher Lasch and Jackson Lears. But Scialabba also believes that Berman "never fully faces up to the possibility of nihilism."

Berman has also contributed unique interpretations of the term "creative destruction", such as in All That is Solid, particularly in the chapter entitled "Innovative Self-Destruction" (pp. 98–104). Here, Berman provides a reading of Marxist "creative destruction" to explain key processes at work within modernity. In 2021, an article was published by Berman's younger son Daniel Berman which attempted to apply to the field of art history, the elder Berman's conception of creative destruction as communicated through his final public lecture "Emerging from the Ruins" (May 2013, Lewis Mumford Lecture @ CCNY). The article, entitled "Looking the Negative in the Face: Creative Destruction and the Modern Spirit in Photography, Photomontage, and Collage", was published in the second issue of Hunter College's graduate art history journal Assemblage.

Bibliography

Books

The Politics of Authenticity: Radical Individualism and the Emergence of Modern Society (1970)
All That Is Solid Melts into Air: The Experience of Modernity (1982)
Adventures in Marxism (1999)
On the Town: One Hundred Years of Spectacle in Times Square (2006)
New York Calling (2007)
Modernism in the Streets: A Life and Times in Essays (2017)

Essays and Articles

The Truth, The Self and The World: Some Characteristic Problems of Romanticism in King's Crown Essays (1961)
Theory and Practice in Partisan Review (1964)
Alienation, Community, Freedom in Dissent (1965)
The Train of History in Partisan Review (1966)
The Lower East Side: Portal to American Life, 1870-1924 in Mosaic (1966)
Subject Slip-Up in The Harvard Crimson (1966)
Abe and Son "Out on Highway 61" in The Flame (1969)
Notes Toward a New Society: Rousseau and the New Left in Partisan Review (1971)
Sympathy for the Devil: Faust, the 1960s, and the Tragedy of Development in American Review (1974)
Buildings Are Judgment in Ramparts (1975)
Buildings Are Judgment II in Ramparts (1975)
The Authentic Rousseau in American Political Science Review (1975)
Liberal and Totalitarian Therapies in Rousseau: A Response to James M. Glass in Political Theory (1976)
The People in Capital in Bennington Review (1978)
Modernism in the Streets in Partisan Review (1979)
Modernity - Yesterday, Today, and Tomorrow in Berkshire Review (1981)
The Bourgois Experience, Victoria to Freud: Volume 1, Education of the Senses in Vanity Fair
The Signs in the Street: A Response to Perry Anderson in New Left Review (1984)
The Place of the Poor in Our Cities in Utne Reader (1987)
Among the Ruins in New Internationalist (1987)
Why Modernism Still Matters in Tikkun (1989)
Taking to the Streets in Boston Review (1989)
A Response to Jeffrey C. Isaac in Tikkun (1989)
Can These Ruins Live? in Parkett (1989)
Modernist Anti-Modernism in New Perspectives Quarterly (1991)
Hitting the Streets in The Los Angeles Times (1992)
Architecture as a Universal Language in Places (1992)
A View from the Bridge in Culturefront (1992)
Roundtable: Nationalism and Ethnic Particularism in Tikkun (1992)
Close to the Edge: Reflections on Rap in Tikkun (1993)
Meyer Schapiro: The Presence of the Subject in New Politics (1996)
Picasso sobreviviendo in etcétera (1997)
The Marriage of Heaven and Hell in Harvard Design Magazine (1998)
Museums in the Age of Giuliani in Art in America (1999)
Lost in the Arcades in Metropolis (2000)
Notes from Underground in Harvard Design Magazine (2001)
Dancing with America: Philip Roth, Writer on the Left in New Labor Forum (2001)
Missing in Action: Death and Life in New York in Lingua Franca (2001)
Tradition... Transgression!: Singer in the Shtetl and on the Street in Logos (2005)
Review: Moment of Grace: The American City in the 1950s by Michael Johns in Harvard Design Magazine (2006)
Review: "Modernism" in Columbia Magazine (2008)

See also

 American philosophy
 Faustian
 
 Praxis School

Notes

References

External links 

Marshall Berman, Freedom and Fetishism, 1963
Marshall Berman, Tradition . . . Transgression! Singer in the Shtetl and on the Street
An Interview with Marshall Berman Interviewed by Tony Monchinski
Marshall Berman's Love Affair With Marx by Christopher Hitchens

1940 births
2013 deaths
20th-century American philosophers
21st-century American philosophers
20th-century American Jews
American Marxists
American non-fiction writers
American socialists
City University of New York faculty
City College of New York faculty
Graduate Center, CUNY faculty
Columbia College (New York) alumni
Harvard University alumni
Alumni of the University of Oxford
Jewish socialists
American literary critics
Critics of postmodernism
Marxist humanists
Marxist theorists
Marxist writers
New York (state) socialists
American political scientists
Urban theorists
Writers from the Bronx
Philosophers from New York (state)
21st-century American Jews